The 1954 United States House of Representatives elections was an election for the United States House of Representatives to elect members to serve in the 84th United States Congress. They were held for the most part on November 2, 1954, in the middle of Dwight Eisenhower's first presidential term, while Maine held theirs on September 13. Eisenhower's Republican Party lost eighteen seats in the House, giving the Democratic Party a majority that it would retain in every House election until 1994.

Perhaps the major reason for the Republican defeat was the backlash against the Army-McCarthy Hearings, in which prominent Republican Senator Joe McCarthy accused countless political and intellectual figures of having Communist ties, usually with no evidence. Another issue was the Dixon-Yates contract to supply power to the Atomic Energy Commission.

Sam Rayburn of Texas became Speaker of the House, exchanging places with new Minority Leader Joseph W. Martin Jr. of Massachusetts; they went back to what they had been before the 1952 elections.

Overall results

September elections

Alabama

Arizona

Arkansas

California 

Of the thirty races, two incumbents retired and were replaced by new members from their party; one Republican lost re-election to a Democrat and one Democrat lost re-election to a Republican; and twenty six incumbents were re-elected.

Colorado

Connecticut

Delaware

Florida

Georgia

Idaho

Illinois

Indiana

Iowa

Kansas

Kentucky

Louisiana

Maine

Maryland

Massachusetts

Michigan

Minnesota

Mississippi

Missouri

Montana

Nebraska

Nevada

New Hampshire

New Jersey

New Mexico

New York

North Carolina

North Dakota

Ohio

Oklahoma

Oregon

Pennsylvania

Rhode Island

South Carolina

South Dakota

Tennessee

Texas

Utah

Vermont

Virginia

Washington

West Virginia

Wisconsin

Wyoming

Non-voting delegates

Alaska Territory

See also
 1954 United States elections
 1954 United States Senate elections
 83rd United States Congress
 84th United States Congress

References

 Bean Louis, Influences in the 1954 Mid-Term Elections. Washington: Public Affairs Institute, 1954

 
November 1954 events in the United States